Reforma is a city and one of the 119 Municipalities of Chiapas, in southern Mexico.

As of 2010, the municipality had a total population of 40,711, up from 34,809 as of 2005. It covers an area of 399.9 km².

As of 2010, the city of Reforma had a population of 26,257. Other than the city of Reforma, the municipality had 33 localities, the largest of which (with 2010 populations in parentheses) were: El Carmen (El Limón) (2,182), Rafael Pascacio Gamboa (1,133), and Miguel Hidalgo (1,056), classified as rural.

On May 8, 2019, an illegal gasoline truck exploded in Reforma. Mayor Herminio Valdez Castillo said the explosion occurred in an uninhabited area and there were no victims.

References

Municipalities of Chiapas